Erik Apple  (born August 26, 1979) is a former American professional mixed martial arts fighter. A professional competitor from 2003 until 2011, he fought for the WEC, Strikeforce, King of the Cage, and ShoXC. Apple also played the character of Pete "Mad Dog" Grimes in the 2011 film Warrior.

Beginning
Apple graduated from Dana Hills High School.

Career
Apple began to train with vale-tudo and MMA legend Marco Ruas at Ruas Vale Tudo team. Now Erik Apple trains at CSW training center with fighters Josh Barnett and Renato Sobral. He beat Matt Makowski at ShoXC – Elite Challenger Series and is currently signed with Strikeforce in the welterweight division. His Strikeforce debut came in a loss to Bobby Voelker. Erik Apple was announced against Seth Baczynski at Strikeforce: Diaz vs. Noons II, but was forced out of the bout due to an injury.

Apple then faced Ryan Larson at Strikeforce Challengers: Beerbohm vs. Healy, losing by triangle choke in the second round.

On a forum, he revealed he was infected with COVID-19 when he attended a club, and has recovered

Mixed martial arts record

|-
| Loss
| align=center| 10–3
| Ryan Larson
| Submission (triangle choke)
| Strikeforce Challengers: Beerbohm vs. Healy
| 
| align=center| 2
| align=center| 3:14
| Cedar Park, Texas, United States
| 
|-
|  Loss
| align=center| 10–2
| Bobby Voelker
| TKO (punches)
| Strikeforce Challengers: Woodley vs. Bears
| 
| align=center| 2
| align=center| 1:23
| Kansas City, Kansas, United States
| 
|-
|  Win
| align=center| 10–1
| Matt Makowski
| Submission (rear-naked choke)
| ShoXC: Elite Challenger Series
| 
| align=center| 2
| align=center| 2:04
| Santa Ynez, California, United States
| 
|-
|  Loss
| align=center| 9–1
| Brock Larson
| Submission (kimura)
| WEC 26: Condit vs. Alessio
| 
| align=center| 1
| align=center| 3:43
| Las Vegas, Nevada, United States
| 
|-
|  Win
| align=center| 9–0
| Ray Elbe
| TKO (knee and punches)
| TC 16: Annihilation
| 
| align=center| 3
| align=center| 2:00
| San Diego, California, United States
| 
|-
|  Win
| align=center| 8–0
| Steve Ramirez
| Submission (triangle choke)
| GC 50: Top Gunz
| 
| align=center| 1
| align=center| 2:37
| Porterville, California, United States
| 
|-
|  Win
| align=center| 7–0
| Danny Wren
| Decision (unanimous)
| Total Combat 12
| 
| align=center| 3
| align=center| 5:00
| Tijuana, Mexico
| 
|-
|  Win
| align=center| 6–0
| Mark Kempthorne
| TKO (corner stoppage)
| KOTC 54: Mucho Machismo
| 
| align=center| 2
| align=center| 1:57
| San Jacinto, California, United States
| 
|-
|  Win
| align=center| 5–0
| Josh Thompson
| Submission (verbal)
| Total Combat 8
| 
| align=center| 1
| align=center| N/A
| Tijuana, Mexico
| 
|-
|  Win
| align=center| 4–0
| Stacy Hakes
| Submission (punches)
| Total Combat 7
| 
| align=center| 1
| align=center| N/A
| Tijuana, Mexico
| 
|-
|  Win
| align=center| 3–0
| Luiz Torres
| TKO (punch)
| Total Combat 6
| 
| align=center| 1
| align=center| 2:10
| Tijuana, Mexico
| 
|-
|  Win
| align=center| 2–0
| Hector Carrilo
| Submission (strikes)
| Total Combat 2
| 
| align=center| 2
| align=center| 1:35
| Tijuana, Mexico
| 
|-
|  Win
| align=center| 1–0
| Chris McMillen
| Submission (choke)
| Gladiator Challenge 15
| 
| align=center| 1
| align=center| 1:56
| Porterville, California, United States
|

References

External links
 
 

1979 births
Living people
American male mixed martial artists
Mixed martial artists from California
Welterweight mixed martial artists
Mixed martial artists utilizing Brazilian jiu-jitsu
Mixed martial artists utilizing Luta Livre
American practitioners of Brazilian jiu-jitsu
People from Laguna Niguel, California
People from Costa Mesa, California